Umalali is a collaborative project put together by Belizean musician and producer, Ivan Duran.  Umalali is defined by the stories that comprise The Garifuna Women's Project.

Background
For Ivan, in part, Umalali is his own story, built on 10 years of recording various female vocalists and collecting songs that told the stories of the women of Garifuna. The Garifuna people are the descendants of shipwrecked African slaves who intermarried with indigenous people and lived on the Caribbean island of St. Vincent in the 17th century. In the 1790s, they were shipped by British authorities to Roatán Island off the Central American coast, and had soon created settlements in Honduras, Belize, Guatemala and Nicaragua.  Duran recorded women and the traditional songs in everyday settings: kitchens, in the streets etc... "The project was always about the stories, about the lives of these women, about capturing the essence of their voices and putting them in a modern context. I was looking for songs that people everywhere could enjoy for their musicality and melodies, not just on a purely intellectual level."

Production
In 2002, five years into the project, Duran constructed a small, thatched roof, studio on the shore of the Caribbean Sea in Belize.  From there, Duran tried to get the women he wanted on the album to take a break from their daily chores and come record.  After getting all of the vocal tracks he wanted, Duran returned to his Stonetree Studio in western Belize and began another five-year process of layering instruments and adding effects to make the local music he had captured, speak to a global audience. In 2007, the final touches were put on the album and the project was complete. In 2008, The Garifuna Women's Project was released on independent label, Cumbancha.

Discography
The Garifuna Women's Project (2008)

Notes

Further reading
The Beat of a Different Culture
Go&Do
WOMAD 2008

Belizean music